Wide Sargasso Sea is a 1966 novel by Jean Rhys.

Wide Sargasso Sea may also refer to:

 Wide Sargasso Sea (1993 film), directed by John Duigan
 Wide Sargasso Sea (2006 film), directed by Brendan Maher
 Wide Sargasso Sea, a stage adaptation by Chamber Made Opera
 "Wide Sargasso Sea", a song on the Stevie Nicks album In Your Dreams

See also
 Sargasso Sea (disambiguation)